Whitehall, Louisiana may refer to:
 Whitehall, La Salle Parish, Louisiana
 Whitehall, Livingston Parish, Louisiana